Jozef Boons (13 February 1943 – 15 December 2000) was a Belgian racing cyclist. He won the Belgian national road race title in 1967. He also competed in the individual road race at the 1964 Summer Olympics. He died in 2000 after being hit by a truck.

References

External links

1943 births
2000 deaths
Belgian male cyclists
People from Forest, Belgium
Olympic cyclists of Belgium
Cyclists at the 1964 Summer Olympics
Road incident deaths in Belgium